UFC 66: Liddell vs. Ortiz was a mixed martial arts (MMA) pay-per-view event held by the Ultimate Fighting Championship on December 30, 2006 at the MGM Grand Garden Arena in Las Vegas, Nevada.

Background
UFC 66s main event was a championship fight with two of the UFC's biggest light heavyweight stars, Light Heavyweight Champion Chuck Liddell defending his title against former champion Tito Ortiz. This fight was first announced by Ortiz at the UFC 63 weigh-ins on September 22, 2006. 

The co-main event saw Forrest Griffin take on "The Dean of Mean" Keith Jardine. The card also saw the return of former Heavyweight Champion Andrei Arlovski and The Ultimate Fighter 3 winner Michael Bisping's first bout in the UFC since winning that season. During the event, it was made official that Mirko "Cro Cop" Filipovic had signed a contract with the UFC, and would make his debut with the organization at UFC 67.

The event was the UFC's first show at MGM Grand Arena since UFC 56, and was nearly sold-out, producing the highest live gate revenue in North American mixed martial arts history, extending the previous record at UFC 57 by over $2,000,000 (USD). At the time, it was estimated to be the UFC's biggest pay-per-view success with just over 1 million buys. 

The disclosed fighter payroll for the event was $767,000.

Results

Bonus awardsFight of the Night: Chuck Liddell vs. Tito OrtizKnockout of the Night: Keith JardineSubmission of the Night: Jason MacDonaldReported salaries
UFC 66 Fighters' Salaries:

Chuck Liddell: $250,000 ($250,000 to fight; no win bonus)
Tito Ortiz: $210,000 ($210,000 to fight; no win bonus)
Andrei Arlovski: $145,000 ($90,000 to fight; $55,000 win bonus)
Michael Bisping: $24,000 ($12,000 to fight; $12,000 win bonus)
Thiago Alves: $22,000 ($11,000 to fight; $11,000 win bonus)
Gabriel Gonzaga: $18,000 ($9,000 to fight; $9,000 win bonus)
Forrest Griffin: $16,000 ($16,000 to fight; no win bonus)
Yushin Okami: $16,000 ($8,000 to fight; $8,000 win bonus)
Keith Jardine: $14,000 ($7,000 to fight; $7,000 win bonus)
Jason MacDonald: $10,000 ($5,000 to fight; $5,000 win bonus)
Chris Leben: $7,000 ($7,000 to fight; no win bonus)
Tony DeSouza: $7,000 ($7,000 to fight; no win bonus)
Christian Wellisch: $6,000 ($3,000 to fight; $3,000 win bonus)
Marcio Cruz: $5,000 ($5,000 to fight; no win bonus)
Carmelo Marrero: $5,000 ($5,000 to fight; no win bonus)
Rory Singer: $5,000 ($5,000 to fight; no win bonus)
Eric Schafer: $4,000 ($4,000 to fight; no win bonus)
Anthony Perosh: $3,000' ($3,000 to fight; no win bonus)

See also
 Ultimate Fighting Championship
 List of UFC champions
 List of UFC events
 2006 in UFC

References

External links
Official UFC 66 website
Official UFC 66 Fight Card
UFC 66 Fight Previews

Ultimate Fighting Championship events
2006 in mixed martial arts
Mixed martial arts in Las Vegas
2006 in sports in Nevada
MGM Grand Garden Arena